Horace Chilton Hooper, Jr. (November 21, 1931 – July 27, 1981), better known as Billy Hooper, was a Canadian football player who played for the Winnipeg Blue Bombers. He played college football at Baylor University.

References

1931 births
1981 deaths
Canadian football quarterbacks
American football quarterbacks
American players of Canadian football
Baylor Bears football players
Winnipeg Blue Bombers players
Players of American football from Texas
People from Sweetwater, Texas